Nicholas Ifill (born November 24, 1968) is a Barbadian-born Canadian cricketer. He is a right-handed batsman and a right-arm medium-pace bowler.

He played in the 1988–89 Under-19s World Cup in Australia, and was a standby for Canada for the 1997 ICC Trophy. Playing for Canada against Bermuda in the 2000 Americas Cup, he took 3 for 78 and earned himself the man of the match award.

He played in the 2000 Red Stripe Bowl, including matches against Trinidad and Tobago, against whom he conceded only 11 runs in 7 overs, and the US, against whom he obtained figures of 3 for 22, figures which include a hat trick. He currently plays for Victoria Park in the Toronto and District League.

He played three matches for Canada in the 2003 Cricket World Cup, but has played just three times for them since, twice in the 2005 ICC Intercontinental Cup and a One Day International against Kenya in 2006.

References
 

1968 births
Living people
Canadian cricketers
Barbadian emigrants to Canada
Canada One Day International cricketers
Black Canadian sportspeople
Barbadian cricketers
Cricketers from Bridgetown